The 358th Infantry Regiment is a unit of the United States Army. Organized in 1917, it took part in both World War I and World War II as a subordinate unit of the 90th Infantry Division.

World War I
The 358th Infantry Regiment was constituted on August 5, 1917 as a unit of the National Army. Part of the 90th Division, it organized and trained at Camp Travis, Fort Sam Houston, Texas before departing for combat in France.

After arriving in Europe, the 358th Infantry took part in the St. Mihiel, Meuse-Argonne, and Lorraine 1918 campaigns. It remained on occupation duty after the war, then returned to the United States. The regiment was demobilized at Camp Pike, Arkansas on June 22, 1919.

Terry de la Mesa Allen Sr., who later commanded the 1st Infantry Division from 1942−1943, commanded the 3rd Battalion of this regiment in 1918.

Post-World War I
When the Army reorganized after World War I, the 358th Infantry was reconstituted on June 24, 1921. Assigned to the Organized Reserves as a unit of the 90th Division, it was organized in November 1921 with its Headquarters in Fort Worth, Texas.

World War II

The 358th Infantry was ordered to active military service on March 25, 1942. It was organized and completed its training at Camp Barkeley, Texas.

After arrival in France, the 358th Infantry took part in combat throughout 1944 and 1945 as part of the 90th Infantry Division. The regiment's campaign participation credit included Normandy, Northern France, Rhineland, Ardennes-Alsace, and Central Europe. The 358th Infantry was demobilized at Camp Myles Standish, Massachusetts on December 26, 1945.

Post-World War II
When the Army reorganized following the war, the 358th Infantry was activated in the Organized Reserve on January 30, 1947, with its headquarters in Fort Worth, Texas. The headquarters moved to College Station, Texas on January 31, 1955 and to Bryan, Texas on November 3, 1958.

Under the Army's 1957 reorganization, on April 1, 1959 the 358th Infantry Regiment was reorganized and redesignated as 1st Battle Group, 358th Infantry, 90th Infantry Division. On March 15, 1963, the unit was again reorganized as 1st and 2nd Battalions, 358th Infantry, 90th Infantry Division. The 1st and 2nd Battalions were inactivated on December 31, 1965.

On October 17, 1999, the 358th Infantry was re-designated the 358th Regiment and organized to consist of 1st, 2d, and 3d Battalions, 358th Regiment, 91st Division (Training Support), a unit of the Army Reserve. After the terrorist attacks of September 11, 2001, the battalions of the 358th Regiment took part in training soldiers for numerous deployments as part of the Global War on Terrorism.

The 358th Regiment was reorganized on October 2, 2009 and the 1st, 2nd, and 3rd Battalions were relieved from assignment to the 91st Division and allocated to the 191st Infantry Brigade at Joint Base Lewis-McChord, Washington. The October 1, 2016 reorganization of the 358th Infantry resulted in 2nd (Armor) and 3rd (Field Artillery) Battalions being allocated to the 189th Combined Arms Training Brigade and assigned to Joint Base Lewis-McChord.

Decorations
The 358th Regiment is entitled to:
French Croix de Guerre with Palm, World War II, Streamer embroidered MOSELLE-SARRE RIVERS

1st Battalion additionally entitled to:
Army Presidential Unit Citation, Streamer embroidered ARDENNES
Army Superior Unit Award, Streamer embroidered 2003-2005

2rd Battalion additionally entitled to:
Army Superior Unit Award, Streamer embroidered 2003-2005
Army Superior Unit Award, Streamer embroidered 2005-2007
Army Superior Unit Award, Streamer embroidered 2008-2011

3rd Battalion additionally entitled to:
Presidential Unit Citation (Army), Streamer embroidered MAHLMANN LINE
Army Superior Unit Award, Streamer embroidered 2003-2005
Army Superior Unit Award, Streamer embroidered 2008-2011

Notes

References

358